Tenoumer is considered to be an impact crater in Mauritania.

Details
The crater is located in the western Sahara Desert.

The crater is exposed at the surface and is nearly circular.

Tenoumer crater has formed in gneiss and granite of Precambrian peneplain with a thin layer of Pliocene sediments (no older). The crater is believed to be caused by an impact event due to basement rocks found outside the crater. A volcanic origin was once theorized because of the discovery of basalt and rhyodacite outside of the crater basin, but current evidence clearly indicates an impact origin.

References

External links
Nasa - Image of the Day February 17, 2008
Meteorite impact structures
Additional Images of Tenoumer crater

Impact craters of Mauritania
Pleistocene impact craters